John Evans (March 9, 1814 – July 2, 1897) was an American politician, physician, founder of various hospitals and medical associations, railroad promoter, governor of the territory of Colorado, and namesake of Evanston, Illinois; Evans, Colorado; and Mount Evans, Colorado.

He is most noted for being one of the founders of both Northwestern University and the University of Denver. The John Evans professorships, the highest honors bestowed on faculty members at both Northwestern University and the University of Denver, are named for him. By bringing railroad service to Denver from several directions, he was responsible for the growth of Denver from a settlement to a city.

Evans was forced to resign the governorship in 1865 for his role in instigating the Sand Creek massacre, one of the worst massacres of Native Americans in U.S. history.

Early life and education
Evans was born in Waynesville, Ohio, on March 9, 1814, to Welsh immigrants Rachel and David Evans, a farmer, hardware store owner, and real estate investor. He began his study of medicine at Clermont Academy in Philadelphia and he graduated from Cincinnati College with a degree in medicine in March 1838.

Career

Medicine

He married Hannah Canby (1813–1850) and moved to West Milton, Ohio, in December 1838. He moved in July 1839 to Attica, Indiana, where he established a medical practice with Isaac Fisher. He practiced medicine and decided to build an asylum for the insane. The Evans family moved to Indianapolis in 1843 to better focus his lobbying efforts with the Indiana legislature. On January 15, 1844, a bill was passed that allowed for a state asylum to be established and Evans was named as one of the commissioners to have the asylum built. From his research on successful asylums, he determined that fresh food and water as well as a country setting were important. Beginning in 1846, he oversaw the construction and became the first superintendent of the Indiana Central State Hospital in 1845.

He taught at Rush Medical College in Chicago and then moved there in 1848. He wrote about and developed a program for quarantine for cholera, which he spoke about to Congress. To reduce trauma that babies received through the use of forceps during birth, he invented an obstetrical extractor. He was owner and editor of a medical journal.

He was a founder of Lakeside Hospital and brought the Sisters of Mercy to staff the hospital, later named Mercy Hospital. He founded the Illinois State Medical Society. To ease seasickness during travel, he patented a suspended bed for ships in 1872 in England, France, the United States, and Italy.

Education
On June 4, 1850, he was one of the group of Methodists who founded Northwestern University, and was elected the first president of its Board of Trustees. While he lived in Evanston and later lived in Colorado, he donated money and land to fund the university's expenses after it opened in Evanston, Illinois, in November 1855.

Governor Evans donated land across from his house in Denver and in March 1864 obtained a charter from the territorial legislature to found the Territory's first college, the Colorado Seminary, which later became the University of Denver. Evans served as the Chairman of the University of Denver Board of Trustees until his death on July 2, 1897. Evans donated land in southeast Denver for a new University of Denver campus in 1890. The area is now called University Park.

Investments
Evans began investing in real estate, banking, and railroads in Chicago, which was foundational to his becoming wealthy. He helped establish the Fort Wayne and Chicago Railroad. Due to the success with his railroad and real estate investments, he no longer practiced medicine by the mid-1850s.

He helped establish the Denver Pacific Railroad to link to Union Pacific's transcontinental line at Cheyenne, Wyoming. He was elected president of Denver Pacific Railroad in 1868 and the railroad connection was completed in 1870. Denver, South Park and Pacific Railroad was incorporated in 1875, which brought rail service on two railroad lines to Colorado's mining region. In the 1880s, he built the Denver and New Orleans Railroad. Railroad service into Colorado helped Denver grow to more than 100,000 people by the 1880s from a frontier town of just a few thousand people.

Politics
He was an alderman for Chicago from 1853 to 1855. He focused on education, public health, and urban development. His wealth garnered him a fair amount of political power. He was one of the founders of the Illinois Republican Party due to his belief that slavery was wrong and became a personal friend of Abraham Lincoln after he campaigned for him in 1860.

Lincoln appointed Evans on March 26, 1862, as the second Governor of the Territory of Colorado. Evans took his oath on April 11 in Washington, D.C., and he arrived in Denver by stagecoach on May 16.  While he was governor, he helped establish the legal system, educational institutions, economy and infrastructure of the Colorado Territory. He also promoted Colorado's statehood, but its citizens overwhelmingly voted against it in September 1864 because the men of the state would be subject to military service for the Civil War and because the territory did not have the population to support running the state without the support of the federal government.

He was also the territory's superintendent of Indian Affairs, but did not consider how greatly Native Americans' lives were impacted by the way in which settlers thwarted their access to resources that they needed to survive. Evans strategy was to create treaties that allocated land for white settlers from Native American tribes.

He believed that constructing railroads from the east and through Colorado was important for the territory's growth. He worked with survey crews to define the best routes. He worked on a enforcing a treaty where Native Americans were assigned to reservations. Native American tribes—the Arapaho, Cheyenne, Kiowa, Ute people and Sioux—were indigenous to Colorado and hunted throughout the area. Hostilities grew as settlers came to Colorado and there was concern that the Native American people would join the Confederate army during the Civil War. He lobbied for railroads for Colorado in Washington, D.C., and he was instrumental in having the Union Pacific Railroad create a link to Denver, having a railroad line connect to San Francisco, and another line from Denver to Galveston, Texas, on the Gulf of Mexico.

Sand Creek Massacre

Citizens of Denver feared that tribes were gathering to over-run Denver. Evans issued a proclamation in August 1864 that authorized "all citizens of Colorado... to go in pursuit of all hostile Indians [and] kill and destroy all enemies of the country." Because of the lack of the ability to defend Denver because of the men fighting in the civil war, Evans ordered that so-called "friendly" "Indians" should present themselves to various forts for their "safety and protection," and those who did not were "hostile" and should be "pursued and destroyed."

Chief Black Kettle had told Native Americans that it was important that they make peace with the settlers or they would be crushed. He met with Lincoln and was very proud to have been given a large American flag in the fall of 1864. Only a few Native Americans, including Black Kettle, accepted Evans' offer of amnesty.

That year, Governor Evans appointed John Chivington as Colonel of the Colorado Volunteers. Chivington and his men knew of the band of Cheyenne and Arapaho led by Black Kettle, who had reported to Fort Lyon as ordered by Evans but left when there were no provisions for them there. Black Kettle and his group then camped along Sand Creek in the east central part of the Territory. This area was within Arapaho and Cheyenne territory according to the Fort Wise Treaty of 1861.

On November 29, 1864, Colonel Chivington ordered 700 cavalry troopers to attack Black Kettle's peaceful encampment, when most of the men were away hunting. They killed about 28 unarmed men and 105 women and children and wounded many more during the Sand Creek massacre. A few Cheyenne, including Black Kettle, were able to escape. Governor Evans decorated Chivington and his men for their "valor in subduing the savages."

Two U.S. Congressional committees and one military committee were formed to investigate the massacre, finding guilt on the part of the U.S. government in 1865. Evans was accused of a coverup. He was forced to resign as Governor in 1865 and Chivington's political ambitions were ruined.

Personal life

Evans married Hannah Canby in 1838. They settled in Attica, Indiana where sons Joseph and Davis were born, in 1839 and 1841 respectively. Evans, raised in the Quaker faith, converted to Methodism, after hearing a talk by Matthew Simpson, a Methodist Episcopal minister. He became a member of the Freemasons. His daughter Josephine was born and his sons died while in Attica. She was the only child of four children born the Evans and his wife to survive childhood. Hannah contracted tuberculosis soon after the family moved to Chicago in 1848. She died on October 9, 1850. Hannah Canby Evans and their sons are buried in the old cemetery in Attica.

On August 18, 1853, he married for the second time to Margaret Patten Gray. She was the sister-in-law of a fellow trustee of Northwestern University. In 1855, he moved to a large house in Evanston, Illinois, which was named for him in 1854. In 1855, Evans and his wife had a son, William Gray Evans, whose efforts led to the development of Moffat Tunnel and the Denver Tramway Company. He came to Denver in 1862 and had a house at 14th and Arapahoe.

In 1871, their daughter Anne was born. She played a key role in the development of the Central City Opera, Civic Center Park, the Denver Public Library, and the Denver Art Museum.

John's daughter, Josephine, married Samuel Hitt Elbert. She died as a young woman and Evans built the Evans Memorial Chapel in her memory. In 1868, John Evans and Samuel Elbert purchased land near Evergreen, Colorado, for a summer retreat and ranch called Evans–Elbert Ranch.

Evans was in poor health in the last year of his life and his wife became the executor of his estate in November 1896. He died in Denver on July 2 or 3 in 1897.

Legacy
John Evans' daughter, Josephine Evans Elbert, was married to Samuel Hitt Elbert, the sixth Governor of Colorado Territory from 1873 to 1874. Mount Evans is named in Evans honor, and Mount Elbert is named in honor of his son-in-law. The name may soon be changed to Mount Blue Sky after the indigenous Arapaho people.

In 1963, he was inducted into the Hall of Great Westerners of the National Cowboy & Western Heritage Museum.

During the 21st century, Evans's legacy came under renewed scrutiny for his beliefs regarding Native Americans. Colorado State Historian David Halaas said, "When it came to Indians, Evans believed they didn’t have souls, that they were heathen savages, they were infernal—all words that he used to describe Indian people."

See also
History of Colorado
Law and government of Colorado
List of governors of Colorado
Territory of Colorado
University of Denver
Northwestern University

Notes

References

External links
 Sand Creek Massacre National Historic Site Study Act of 1998 
The Governors of Colorado @ Colorado.gov
Biography of John Evans @ Colorado.gov

1814 births
1897 deaths
Colorado Mining Boom
Evanston, Illinois
Governors of Colorado Territory
Colorado Republicans
Northwestern University faculty
People from Waynesville, Ohio
People of Colorado in the American Civil War
University of Denver people
Physicians from Indiana
American people of Welsh descent
University and college founders
Illinois Republicans
19th-century American politicians
Methodists from Illinois
Converts to Methodism
Methodists from Indiana
Methodists from Colorado
Founders of schools in the United States